This is a list of lawyers who held the rank of serjeant-at-law at the Bar of Ireland.

Origins of the office of serjeant

The first recorded serjeant was Roger Owen, who was appointed between 1261 and 1266, although the title itself was not commonly used in Ireland until about 1388; the earlier terms were "serviens", "King's Narrator" or "King's Pleader". The term Pleader was still in use in the 1470s. However, there is a reference to Richard le Blond as the King's "Serjeant pleader" in 1305 or 1306. In the early years of the office, appointment as serjeant might be temporary and might cover only a part of the country, although John de Neville was acting  as Serjeant in 1295-6 "for all parts of Ireland". Roger l'Enfant in the late 1370s appears to have pleaded mainly in Cork City. As a rule, they were licensed to appear in all of the Royal Courts, although John Haire in 1392 was described as "Serjeant-at-law of our Lord the King in the Common Pleas".

The serjeant's duties were numerous and varied. Early serjeants spent much time suing to recover Royal lands which had been unlawfully disposed of, and recovering other Crown property like weirs and fisheries. They also spent a surprisingly large amount of time protecting the Crown's right of advowson: i.e. the right of nomination of a parish priest to a particular church (many private landowners also acquired the right).

In 1537 a Royal Commission on law reform considered recommending the abolition of the office of Serjeant, and the transfer of his functions to the Attorney General, but nothing came of the proposal, probably due to firm opposition from the Serjeant-at-law of the day, Patrick Barnewall, who appealed to long-standing tradition. He argued that the Serjeant-at-law had argued in Court on the Crown's behalf for 200 years, and the system worked perfectly well.

The role of the serjeant-at-law

In contrast to England, for many years there was only one serjeant-at-law in Ireland, who was known as the "king's serjeant" or simply "serjeant". In 1627 another officeholder was appointed, and the two were known as the "prime serjeant" and "second serjeant". In 1682 a "third serjeant" was appointed. In 1805 the prime serjeant became known as "first serjeant."

Until the nineteenth century, the need for three serjeants was often questioned, especially as the office of Third Serjeant was often left vacant for several years. It seems that the position of third serjeant was created simply as a form of "consolation prize" for Sir John Lyndon, the first holder of the office, who had been passed over as both a High Court judge and as second serjeant, and no particular duties attached to the office. Certainly, Sir Richard Ryves, the Recorder of Dublin, was able to combine the notoriously gruelling office of recorder with the position of third serjeant, and later second serjeant, which suggests that he was not overworked in his role as serjeant. Alan Brodrick, 1st Viscount Midleton, who was removed from his office of third serjeant in 1692, complained about his dismissal, but admitted that in his two years in the office he had almost no work to do. Hewitt Poole Jellett, second serjeant in the early 1900s, was so old in his final years that his office was clearly an honorary one.

Emoluments 
The position was extremely lucrative, at least until the late eighteenth century. Although in theory the salary in the 1690s was fixed at £30 a year, it was well known that in practice the various perquisites attached to the office brought it up to between £900 and £1000 a year, in addition to what the office holder earned from private fees, as it was the serjeant's right to continue to take briefs on behalf of clients other than the Crown. In the early centuries, it was apparently normal procedure for the Serjeants to take private work, although it was understood that Crown work took precedence: a retainer agreement made between William of Bardfield, King's Serjeant, and his client Nicholas, son of John of Interberge, in the early 1300s spells this out. In the early centuries the Serjeant might be paid for his work in a single session, as for example, Roger L' Enfant was in 1377.

By the late nineteenth century, according to Maurice Healy, the rule had grown up that the Serjeants could not take cases against the Crown, and by then they had ceased to receive a salary; the assurance of a steady supply of Crown work was felt to be a sufficient reward.

Duties and precedence 
From the fourteenth century on the serjeant usually had a seat in the Irish House of Commons. As a government officeholder, he was expected to manage parliamentary business in the Commons on the government's behalf. Because he was a government appointment he was liable to summary dismissal on a change of government, as happened most notably in 1714, oh the accession of the House of Hanover. In the early centuries he was invariably a member of the Privy Council of Ireland; later the attorney general took his place (as early as 1441 Stephen Roche, the king's attorney, is recorded as a member of the Council).

The serjeants-at-law ranked ahead of the Attorney-General for Ireland and the Solicitor-General for Ireland (who on occasion was the same person) until 1805, when the law officers took precedence, the office of prime serjeant being downgraded to first serjeant, with precedence over the other two serjeants but not the law officers. From about 1660 onwards they were expected to consult with the attorney general and were discouraged from acting on their own initiative: in 1692 the prime serjeant, John Osborne, was dismissed for repeatedly acting in opposition to Crown policy. From the 1560s on the serjeants acted as "messengers" to the Irish House of Commons i.e. they were summoned to advise the House on points of law, just as the High Court judges advised the Irish House of Lords. The role of messenger lapsed around 1740.

Most sixteenth-century serjeants, including Thomas Rochfort, Thomas Luttrell, Patrick Barnewall and John Bathe, were solicitors-general at the same time, suggesting that the latter office was both junior and not very onerous. At least one serjeant of the era, Richard Finglas, combined the office of serjeant with the subordinate office of Principal Solicitor for Ireland.

In the seventeenth and eighteenth centuries, the serjeants often acted as extra judges of assize. Although the practice had its critics, it survived intermittently into the nineteenth century: Walter Berwick was chairman of the East Cork Quarter Sessions from 1856 to 1859, while also serving as serjeant, and Sir John Howley was both serjeant-at-law and chairman of the County Tipperary Quarter Sessions for 30 years. Howley however was criticised for what was called his "legal pluralism". At least one serjeant, Sir John Bere (1609–17), went as a judge of assize while sitting as an MP in the Parliament of 1613-15, which would be considered entirely unacceptable nowadays, although Irish judges then were often encouraged by the Crown to sit.

Many, but not all, serjeants went on to become judges of one of the courts of common law. Hewitt Poole Jellett followed a somewhat unusual path in that he was appointed serjeant after retiring from office as chairman of the Quarter Sessions for Queen's County (now County Laois) and returning to practice at the Bar. Even more surprisingly, he remained a serjeant for life and was still in office when he was eighty-five. Joseph Stock was a judge of the Irish Admiralty Court both before and during his long tenure as serjeant (1840–51), although he was clearly only a part-time judge.

Abolition of the office of serjeant 
No serjeants were appointed after 1919, and on the establishment of the Irish Free State, the rank ceased to exist. The last surviving serjeant, Alexander Sullivan, moved to England where he practised at the English Bar, and as a mark of courtesy was always addressed as Serjeant Sullivan.

King’s serjeants, 1261–1627
 1261: Roger Owen
 1270: Robert of St. Edmund
 1281: John Fitzwilliam
 1292: John de Ponz (also called John de Ponte or John of Bridgwater)
 1293: John de Neville
 1297: William of Bardfield
 1297: Richard le Blond
 1310: Matthew of Harwood
 1316 Nicholas de Snyterby
 1319: John of Staines
 12 February 1326: Simon Fitz-Richard
 29 September 1327 John of Cardiff, also called John de la Battalk
 29 September 1327 John Gernoun
 1331 Thomas de Dent
 3 December 1341: Hugh Brown
 1 June 1343: William le Petit
 1348: Robert Preston, later 1st Baron Gormanston
 1356: John Keppock
 1358: Richard White
 19 November 1357: Edmund de Bereford, or Edmund of Barford
 1373/4: John Tirel, or Tyrell
 18 April 1375: Richard Plunkett
 1375: Walter Cotterell
 Before June 1377: Roger L' Enfant. He  was described as "continuously acting as King's Pleader at the  Cork sessions" that year, and received a special fee of 20 shillings as his reward.
 1383: Peter Rowe
 1386: Richard Glynon
 24 September 1388: John Bermyngham
 1392: John Haire, described as "Serjeant of our Lord the King in the Common Pleas" 
 1393: Nicholas White
 1406: James Uriell
 10 December 1420: Maurice Stafford 
 20 October 1422: Christopher Bernevall
 8 November 1434: Sir Thomas Fitz-Christopher Plunket
 20 June 1435: Robert Dowdall
 4 February 1437: Edward Somerton
 24 June 1447 : Thomas Snetterby
 1460: Peter Trevers
 1462: Thomas Dowdall
 1463: Philip Bermingham
 1471: Henry Duffe
 1477: John Estrete
 1496: Thomas Kent
 1501: John Egyr
 1504: John Barnewall, 3rd Baron Trimlestown
 1506: Clement Fitzleones
 1509: Patrick Finglas
 1511: Thomas Rochfort
 1516: Thomas Fitzsimons
 1520: Robert Barnewall (King's Serjeant)
 1532: Sir Thomas Luttrell
 1534: Patrick Barnewall
 1550: Sir John Bathe
 11 September 1554: Richard Finglas
 21 February 1574: Edward Fitz-Symon
 9 May 1594: Arthur Corye
 1 November 1597: Sir Edward Loftus
 8 June 1601: Nicholas Kerdiffe
 9 February 1609: Sir John Bere
 13 May 1617: Sir John Brereton

Prime serjeants, 1627–1805
 23 May 1627: Sir John Brereton
 6 October 1629: James Barry
 August 1634: Sir Maurice Eustace
 20 September 1660: Sir Audley Mervyn
 26 October 1675: Sir William Davys
 by 1680: John Osborne (succeeded under a patent of reversion dated 29 August 1676; removed from office in 1686)
 15 February 1687: Garrett Dillon
 29 September 1690: John Osborne (restored to office in 1690, removed a second time in 1692)
 29 December 1692: Nehemiah Donnellan
 5 November 1695: Sir Thomas Pakenham
 1 December 1703: Robert Saunders
 28 February 1708: William Neave
 8 December 1714: William Caulfeild
 11 August 1711: Robert Blennerhassett
 9 February 1712: Morley Saunders
 13 June 1715: Godfrey Boate
 23 June 1716: Robert Fitzgerald
 26 January 1724: Francis Bernard
 22 June 1726: Henry Singleton
 14 January 1742: Arthur Blennerhassett
 9 May 1743: Anthony Malone
 24 January 1754: Eaton Stannard
 6 October 1757: William Scott
 27 July 1759: Thomas Tennison
 11 December 1761: John Hely-Hutchinson
 18 July 1774: James Dennis
 24 July 1777: Walter Hussey Burgh
 14 June 1780: James Browne
 1 June 1782: Walter Hussey Burgh (again)
 13 July 1782: Thomas Kelly
 31 December 1783: John Scott
 21 May 1784: James Browne (again)
 21 June 1787: James Fitzgerald
 28 January 1799: St George Daly
 1 July 1801: Edmond Stanley
 29 December 1802: Arthur Browne

First serjeants, 1805–
 25 July 1805: Arthur Moore
 25 July 1816: William Johnson
 28 October 1817: Henry Joy
 13 May 1822: Thomas Lefroy
 April 1830: Thomas Goold
 February 1832: Edward Pennefather
 23 May 1835: Richard Wilson Greene
 November 1842: Joseph Stock
 June 1851: Sir John Howley
 27 February 1866: Richard Armstrong
 25 October 1880: David Sherlock
 20 May 1884: James Robinson
 19 July 1885: Charles Hare Hemphill
 17 November 1892: William Bennet Campion
 5 December 1907: Charles Andrew O'Connor
 14 January 1910: John Francis Moriarty
 5 July 1913: Charles Louis Matheson
 29 October 1919: Alexander Martin Sullivan – the last Irish serjeant

Second serjeants, 1627– 
 23 May 1627: Sir Nathaniel Catelyn
 14 April 1637: Sir Maurice Eustace
 4 March 1661: Sir William Sambach
 6 April 1670: Robert Griffith
 10 May 1673: Henry Hene
 26 May 1674: Sir Richard Reynell, 1st Baronet
 7 April 1680: Sir Richard Stephens (dismissed 1682)
 24 October 1682: William Beckett
 7 August 1683: Sir Richard Ryves (removed from office 1687)
 May 1687: Sir Henry Echlin
 14 November 1690: Sir Richard Stephens (restored)
 5 January 1691: Sir Richard Ryves (restored)
 8 February 1692:  Sir Thomas Pakenham
 13 January 1696: William Neave
 1 December 1708: William Caulfeild (resigned)
 14 August 1711: Morley Saunders
 12 February 1712: John Cliffe
 18 December 1714: Robert Fitzgerald
 23 August 1716: John Witherington
 23 December 1718: William Brodrick (politician), brother of Viscount Midleton who was Third Serjeant 1691-1711, (Plantation owner in Montserrat, West Indies), Attorney General of Jamaica 1692-1715
 5 January 1728: Robert Dixon
 29 April 1731: Richard Bettesworth
 31 March 1741: Robert Marshall
 25 November 1757: Richard Malone
 10 September 1759: Edmond Malone (brother of the preceding)
 14 January 1767: James Dennis
 19 July 1774: Maurice Coppinger
 5 November 1777: Hugh Carleton
 8 May 1779: Attiwell Wood
 8 April 1784: James Fitzgerald
 27 June 1787: John Toler
 17 August 1789: Joseph Hewitt
 30 July 1791: Henry Duquerry
 10 December 1793: Sir James Chatterton, 1st Baronet
 23 April 1806: John Ball
 3 December 1813: William MacMahon
 4 March 1814: Willliam Johnson
 26 July 1816: Henry Joy
 29 October 1817: Richard Jebb
 1 December 1818: Charles Burton
 3 December 1820: Thomas Lefroy
 13 May 1822: John Lloyd
 19 April 1830: Francis Blackburne
 18 January 1831: Edward Pennefather
 13 February 1832: Michael O'Loghlen
 27 January 1835: Joseph Devonsher Jackson
 November 1841: Joseph Stock
 November 1842: Richard Benson Warren
 July 1848: Sir John Howley
 June 1851: James O'Brien
 5 February 1858: Walter Berwick
 1859: Gerald Fitzgibbon
 25 February 1860: James Anthony Lawson
 21 February 1861: Edward Sullivan
 18 February 1865: Richard Armstrong
 24 February 1866: Sir Colman O'Loghlen, Bt
 29 November 1877: David Sherlock
 25 October 1880: James Robinson
 20 May 1884: Charles Hare Hemphill
 19 July 1885: Peter O'Brien
 14 July 1887: William Bennett Campion
 17 November 1892: Hewitt Poole Jellett
 18 July 1911: Ignatius O'Brien, 1st Baron Shandon
 9 December 1911: Thomas Molony
 20 July 1912: Charles Louis Matheson
 5 July 1913: Alexander Martin Sullivan
 29 October 1919: George McSweeney

Third serjeants, 1682– 
 24 July 1682: Sir John Lyndon
 19 February 1683: Sir Richard Ryves
 3 August 1683: Sir Henry Echlin
 6 May 1687: Sir John Barnewall
 March 1688: Sir Theobald Butler
 5 January 1691: Alan Brodrick, 1st Viscount Midleton
 29 November 1711: John Cliffe
 25 February 1712: John Staunton
 14 December 1714: John Witherington
 28 March 1726: Robert Jocelyn
 4 May 1727: John Bowes
 October 1730: Henry Purdon
 18 April 1737: Robert Marshall
 21 January 1742: Philip Tisdall
 28 October 1751: Richard Malone
 24 November 1757: Marcus Paterson
 10 October 1764: James Dennis
 15 January 1767: Godfrey Lill
 12 July 1770: Maurice Coppinger
 20 July 1774: George Hamilton
 15 May 1776: Hugh Carleton
 6 November 1777: Attiwell Wood
 8 May 1779: James Fitzgerald
 25 July 1782: Peter Metge
 15 January 1784: John Toler
 27 June 1787: Joseph Hewitt
 17 August 1789: Henry Duquerry
 30 July 1791: James Chatterton
 10 December 1793: Edmond Stanley
 30 October 1801: Arthur Moore
 25 July 1805: Charles Kendal Bushe
 25 October 1805: John Ball
 23 April 1806: William MacMahon
 4 December 1813: Willliam Johnson
 19 March 1814: Henry Joy
 27 July 1816: Richard Jebb
 30 October 1817: Charles Burton
 1 December 1818: Thomas Lefroy
 13 February 1821: Thomas Burton Vandeleur
 13 May 1822: Robert Torrens
 13 July 1823: Thomas Goold
 April 1830: Edward Pennefather
 18 January 1831: Michael O'Loghlen
 7 February 1832: Louis Perrin
 23 May 1835: Stephen Woulfe
 10 November 1836: Nicholas Ball
 20 July 1838: William Curry 
 May 1840: Richard Moore
 August 1840: Joseph Stock
 November 1841: Richard Benson Warren
 November 1842: Richard Keating
 September 1843: Sir John Howley
 July 1848: James O'Brien
 June 1851: Jonathan Christian
 1855: Walter Berwick
 5 February 1858: Rickard Deasy
 1859: Gerald Fitzgibbon
 1859: Thomas O'Hagan
 24 October 1860: Edward Sullivan
 21 February 1861: Richard Armstrong
 18 February 1865: Sir Colman O'Loghlen, Bt
 24 February 1866: Charles Robert Barry
 12 January 1867: Richard Dowse
 11 March 1870: David Sherlock
 29 November 1877: James Robinson
 25 October 1880: Denis Caulfield Heron
 30 May 1881: John O'Hagan
 13 September 1881: Charles Hare Hemphill
 26 May 1884:  Peter O'Brien
 18 July 1885: John George Gibson
 5 December 1885: William Bennett Campion
 14 July 1887: Dodgson Hamilton Madden
 14 February 1888: Hewitt Poole Jellett
 17 November 1892: William Huston Dodd
 23 March 1907: Charles Andrew O'Connor
 5 December 1907: Matthew Bourke
 5 June 1909 : John Francis Moriarty
 14 January 1910: Ignatius O'Brien, 1st Baron Shandon
 18 May 1911 : Thomas Molony
 8 December 1911: Charles Louis Matheson
 20 July 1912: Alexander Martin Sullivan
 5 July 1913: George McSweeney
 29 October 1919: Henry Hanna

References
Casey, James The Irish Law Officers Round Hall Sweet and Maxwell 1996
 Hart, A.R. A History of the King's Serjeants at law in Ireland Four Courts Press Dublin 2000
 John Haydn and Horace Ockerby, The Book of Dignities, 3rd edition, London 1894 (reprinted Bath 1969)
 Healy, Maurice, The Old Munster Circuit Michael Joseph Ltd. 1939 (reprinted Cork Mercier Press 1979)
Smyth, Constantine Joseph Chronicle of the Law Officers of Ireland London Butterworths 1839

Footnotes

Bar associations of Europe
Law Officers of the Crown in the United Kingdom
 Ireland
1805 establishments in the United Kingdom